Nailady Shivarama Lakshminarayan Bhatta (29 October 1936 – 6 March 2021) was a Kannada poet from Shivamogga district. He was awarded the Karnataka Sahitya Academy award in 1974.

Career 
 As academic
After completing a M.A., from Maharaja's college in Mysore and a PhD at Bangalore University, he served briefly as a teacher of Kannada literature at Acharya Pata Shala (APS College) in Bangalore before joining Bangalore University. There he served as a professor and chairman of the department for more than 20 years serving as the dean (1990) of the Arts College prior to his retirement from the University. 

As poet
His very early work Horalu Daariyalli Kaavya (Poetry on a fun road), in the early 1970s earned him the Sahitya Academy award and announced him to the literary world as a poet of much skill. Bhatta has translated 50 sonnets of William Shakespeare, the poetry of TS Eliot and works of poet Yeats into Kannada language. The Masti Award was given to poet N.S. Lakshminarayana Bhatta in 2007.  He has been recognized for his contribution to modern Kannada poetry and literary criticism with numerous awards and honors. His effort related to popularizing the works of the bard Shishunala Sharif led to a renaissance in the Kannada Bhavageetha movement, earning Dr. Bhatta the moniker of "Sharif Bhatta".

His work "Readings in Kannada" on making Kannada more accessible to the masses has been among the popular books ever written in that realm and sold over 200,000 copies over several editions.  He has been honored with numerous awards including the Central Sahitya Academy Award and The AnaKru Prashasthi.

His latest work, Samagra Kannada Sahitya Charitre (A Comprehensive History of Kannada Literature) was published in 2014.

Death 
Bhatta died on 6 March 2021 in Bengaluru due to age related ailments. He was 84.

References

3. Has received 'Being Different' award from PGDILS 1 AMONG BILLIONS FOUNDATION BANGALORE in 2015.

External links
 Lakshminarayana Bhatta's works
 Dr NS Lakshminarayana Bhatta's Passing Away News
 Lakshminarayana Bhatta's Death News

1936 births
2021 deaths
Kannada poets
Kannada-language writers
Educators from Karnataka
Kannada people
People from Shimoga district
Poets from Karnataka
20th-century Indian poets
Indian male poets
20th-century Indian male writers